Ernest Arthur Foo (30 July 1891 – 27 February 1934) was an Australian rules footballer who played with St Kilda in the Victorian Football League (VFL).

Family
The son of Thomas Foo and Mary Jane Williams (d. 1917), Ernest Arthur Foo was born in Fitzroy on 30 July 1891. He married Olive Ida Wise in 1914. They were divorced in 1920. He married Lily Edna Hebditch in 1929.

Military service
Foo fought in World War I—having enlisting under the anglicised name "Ernest Arthur Ford"—serving in France in the latter stages of the war.

Death
He died on 27 February 1934 at the Caulfield Military Hospital.

Notes

References
 World War I Service Record: Private Ernest Arthur Ford (7842), National Archives of Australia.

External links 

1891 births
1934 deaths
Australian rules footballers from Melbourne
St Kilda Football Club players
Australian people of Chinese descent
Australian military personnel of World War I
People educated at Wesley College (Victoria)
People from Fitzroy, Victoria
Military personnel from Melbourne